Suffield Depot is the name of a census-designated place (CDP) corresponding to the village of Suffield, the primary settlement of the town of Suffield, Connecticut, in Hartford County. The population of the CDP was 1,325 as of the 2010 census.

Geography
Suffield Depot is named for the end of a spur railroad line leading to Suffield village from the town of Windsor Locks to the south. The center of the village is located on a ridge east of the railroad line, with a town green occupying the area around the intersection of North and South Main Street (Connecticut Route 75) with Mountain Road (Connecticut Route 168) and Bridge Street.

Demographics
As of the census of 2000, there were 1,244 people, 569 households, and 298 families residing in the Suffield Depot CDP. The racial makeup of the CDP was 95.26% White, 3.38% African American, 0.08% Native American, 0.32% Asian, 0.80% from other races, and 0.16% from two or more races. Hispanic or Latino of any race were 2.25% of the population.

There were 569 households, out of which 26.2% had children under the age of 18 living with them, 44.5% were married couples living together, 6.2% had a female householder with no husband present, and 47.5% were non-families. 40.8% of all households were made up of individuals, and 26.2% had someone living alone who was 65 years of age or older.  The average household size was 2.19 and the average family size was 3.05.

In the CDP, the population was spread out, with 23.9% under the age of 18, 4.7% from 18 to 24, 27.8% from 25 to 44, 24.0% from 45 to 64, and 19.5% who were 65 years of age or older.  The median age was 42 years. For every 100 females, there were 81.1 males.  For every 100 females age 18 and over, there were 73.1 males.

The median income for a household in the CDP was $42,043, and the median income for a family was $75,098. Males had a median income of $50,375 versus $32,411 for females. The per capita income for the CDP was $25,290.  About 4.6% of families and 9.1% of the population were below the poverty line, including 6.1% of those under age 18 and 7.9% of those age 65 or over.

References 

Census-designated places in Hartford County, Connecticut
Neighborhoods in Connecticut
Census-designated places in Connecticut